Victor Vina (1885–1961) was a French film actor.

He was born Victor Emanuel Jules Vinatieri in Saint-Maur-des-Fossés, France and died in Paris.

Selected filmography
 The Portrait (1923)
 Faces of Children (1925)
 Carmen (1926)
 Madame Récamier (1928)
 Island of Love (1929)
 77 Rue Chalgrin (1931)
 Imperial Violets (1932)
 The Woman Dressed As a Man (1932)
 The Tunnel (1933)
 Casanova (1934)
 Golgotha (1935)
 Stradivarius (1935)
 The Call of Silence (1936)
 Michel Strogoff (1936)
 Compliments of Mister Flow (1936)
 The Red Dancer (1937)
 The Patriot (1938)
 Barnabé (1938)
 The Bouquinquant Brothers (1947)
 The Secret of Monte Cristo (1948)
 The Barton Mystery (1949)

References

Bibliography
 Goble, Alan. The Complete Index to Literary Sources in Film. Walter de Gruyter, 1999.

External links

1885 births
1961 deaths
French male film actors
French male silent film actors
20th-century French male actors
People from Saint-Maur-des-Fossés